Michael Calderón (born December 6, 1988) is a Costa Rican professional footballer who plays as a midfielder.

Career

Early career
Calderón played two years of college soccer at Fairleigh Dickinson University between 2010 and 2011, before transferring to the University of New Mexico, where he played in 2012 and 2013.

Professional career
On January 21, 2014, Calderón was drafted in the fourth round (64th overall) of the 2014 MLS SuperDraft by Vancouver Whitecaps FC. However, he wasn't signed by the club.

Calderón signed with USL Pro club Wilmington Hammerheads on April 2, 2014.
He is now a soccer coach at Indian Hills and the RYSA wildcats. He focuses on possession and passing of the ball.

References

External links 

1988 births
Living people
Footballers from San José, Costa Rica
Costa Rican footballers
Costa Rican expatriate footballers
Fairleigh Dickinson Knights men's soccer players
New Mexico Lobos men's soccer players
Wilmington Hammerheads FC players
Association football midfielders
Expatriate soccer players in the United States
Vancouver Whitecaps FC draft picks
USL Championship players
Costa Rica under-20 international footballers